Honoré Petit (January 26, 1847 – December 1, 1922) was a farmer, lumberman and political figure in Quebec. He represented Chicoutimi-Saguenay from 1892 to 1912 as a Conservative and Chicoutimi from 1912 to 1919 as a Liberal in the Legislative Assembly of Quebec.

He was born in Cap-Santé, Canada East, the son of Jean-Baptiste Petit and Marguerite Doré, and was educated at Cap-Santé, Neuville and Lévis. He worked for the Price lumber company for 26 years. Petit was mayor of Sainte-Anne-de-Chicoutimi and warden for Chicoutimi County. He was defeated by Onésime Côté when he ran for a seat in the Quebec assembly in 1890. Petit was defeated when he ran for reelection in 1919. He died three years later in Chicoutimi at the age of 74.

References

 

Conservative Party of Quebec MNAs
Quebec Liberal Party MNAs
Mayors of places in Quebec
1847 births
1922 deaths